The Journal of English and Germanic Philology is a quarterly peer-reviewed academic journal of medieval studies that was established in 1897 and is now published by University of Illinois Press. Its focus is on the cultures of English, Germanic, and Celtic-speaking parts of medieval northern Europe. Previous editors-in-chief include Albert S. Cook and George T. Flom.

References

External links
 
 Volumes 1-21 in PDF-format, The Internet Archive.
 Journal of English and Germanic Philology at Project MUSE

Celtic studies journals
Germanic philology journals
University of Illinois Press academic journals
European history journals
Publications established in 1897
Multilingual journals
Quarterly journals